The Mozart Medal of the Mozartgemeinde Wien was a music award named after Wolfgang Amadeus Mozart.

Recipients

Heinrich Damisch, 1952
Wilhelm Furtwängler, 1952
Heinrich von Kralik, 1952
Joseph Marx, 1952
Edwin Fischer, 1953
Egon von Komorzynsky, 1953
Irmgard Seefried, 1953
Wiener Philharmoniker, 1953
Audrey Christie, 1954
John Christie, 1954
Ernst Moravec, 1954
Leopold Nowak, 1954
Leopold Wlach, 1954
Johann Nepomuk David, 1955
Anton Dermota, 1955
Hans Pemmer, 1955
Erich Schenk, 1955
Amis de Mozart Paris, 1956
Boston Symphony Orchestra, 1956
Comune di Milano, 1956
Deutsche Grammophon Gesellschaft, 1956
Karl Böhm, 1957
Maria Gerhart, 1957
Erich Kunz, 1957
Erich Müller-Asow, 1957
Willy Boskovsky, 1958
Franziska Martienssen-Lohmann, 1958
Julius Patzak, 1958
Wiener Oktett, 1958
Wiener Symphoniker, 1958
Hans Duhan, 1960
Bernhard Paumgartner, 1960
Erik Werba, 1960
Josef Witt, 1960
Wilhelm Backhaus, 1961
Ferdinand Grossmann, 1961
Wise Helletsgruber, 1961
Carl Schuricht, 1961
Dietrich Fischer-Dieskau, 1963
Ferenc Fricsay, 1963
Hans Joachim Moser, 1963
Wiener Phil. Streichquartett, 1963
Elisabeth Höngen, 1964
Sena Jurinac, 1964
Emmy Loose, 1964
Maria Reining, 1964
Paul Schöffler, 1964
Oscar Fritz Schuh, 1964
Otto Erich Deutsch, 1965
Frank Martin, 1965
Yehudi Menuhin, 1965
Gustav Hillström, 1966
Wilfried Scheib, 1966
Franz Samohyl, 1966
Gerhard Croll, 1968
Hilde Konetzni, 1968
Wilhelm Rohm, 1968
Hans Sittner, 1968
Hans Swarowsky, 1968
Christa Ludwig, 1969
Jacques Chailley, 1969
Karl Öhlberger, 1969
Walter Berry, 1969
Heinz Scholz, 1969
Dmitri Shostakovich, 1969
Nicolai Gedda, 1970
Walter Gerstenberg, 1970
Ingrid Haebler, 1970
Egon von Komorzynsky, 1970
George London, 1970
Alfred Uhl, 1970
Erich Marckhl, 1971
Manuel Capdevila, 1971
Norbert Sprongl, 1971
Henryk Szeryng, 1971
Erich Valentin, 1971
Claudio Abbado, 1973
Friedrich Gehmacher, 1973
Alexander Weinmann, 1973
Fritz Heindl, 1974
Walter Senn, 1974
Otto Strasser, 1974
Hans Zwölfer, 1974
Amadeus Quartet, 1975
Karl Pfannhauser, 1975
Keisei Sakka, 1975

References

Austrian music awards
Wolfgang Amadeus Mozart
Awards established in 1952
1952 establishments in Austria